The Finer Things is a compilation album box set of recordings by Steve Winwood. It includes songs from his early days with The Spencer Davis Group through Traffic and Blind Faith and into his work during his solo career.

Track listing

Disc one
 "Dimples" - Spencer Davis Group
 "I Can't Stand It" - Spencer Davis Group
 "Every Little Bit Hurts" - Spencer Davis Group
 "Strong Love" - Spencer Davis Group
 "Keep on Running" - Spencer Davis Group
 "Somebody Help Me" - Spencer Davis Group
 "When I Come Home" - Spencer Davis Group
 "I Want to Know" - Eric Clapton and the Powerhouse
 "Crossroads" - Eric Clapton and the Powerhouse
 "Gimme Some Lovin'" - Spencer Davis Group
 "I'm a Man" - Spencer Davis Group
 "Paper Sun" - Traffic
 "Dealer" - Traffic
 "Coloured Rain" - Traffic
 "No Face, No Name, No Number" - Traffic
 "Heaven Is in Your Mind" - Traffic
 "Smiling Phases" - Traffic
 "Dear Mr. Fantasy" - Traffic
 "Pearly Queen" - Traffic
 "(Roamin' Thro' the Gloamin' With) 40,000 Headman" - Traffic
 "No Time to Live" - Traffic
 "Shanghai Noodle Factory" - Traffic
 "Medicated Goo" - Traffic
 "Withering Tree" - Traffic

Disc two
 "Had to Cry Today" - Blind Faith
 "Can't Find My Way Home" - Blind Faith
 "Sea of Joy" - Blind Faith
 "Sleeping in the Ground [Live]" - Blind Faith
 "Under My Thumb [Live]" - Blind Faith
 "Stranger to Himself" - Traffic
 "John Barleycorn" - Traffic
 "Glad" - Traffic
 "Freedom Rider" - Traffic
 "Empty Pages" - Traffic
 "The Low Spark of High Heeled Boys" - Traffic
 "Rainmaker" - Traffic

Disc three
 "Shoot Out at Fantasy Factory" - Traffic
 "(Sometimes I Feel So) Uninspired [Live]" - Traffic
 "Happy Vibes" - Steve Winwood, Remi Kabaka and Abdul Lasisi Amao
 "Something New" - Traffic
 "Dream Gerrard" - Traffic
 "Walking in the Wind" - Traffic
 "When the Eagle Flies" - Traffic
 "Winner/Loser" - Stomu Yamashta's Go
 "Crossing the Line [Live]" - Stomu Yamashta's Go
 "Hold On" - Steve Winwood
 "Time Is Running Out" - Steve Winwood
 "Vacant Chair" - Steve Winwood

Disc four
 "While You See a Chance" - Steve Winwood
 "Arc of a Diver" - Steve Winwood
 "Spanish Dancer" - Steve Winwood
 "Night Train" - Steve Winwood
 "Dust" - Steve Winwood
 "Valerie" - Steve Winwood
 "Talking Back to the Night" - Steve Winwood
 "Your Silence Is Your Song" - Steve Winwood
 "Higher Love" - Steve Winwood
 "Freedom Overspill" - Steve Winwood
 "Back in the High Life Again" - Steve Winwood
 "The Finer Things" - Steve Winwood
 "Roll with It" - Steve Winwood
 "Don't You Know What the Night Can Do?" - Steve Winwood
 "One and Only Man" - Steve Winwood

References

External links
The Finer Things at Allmusic

Steve Winwood albums
1995 compilation albums
Island Records compilation albums